Hanyer Luis Mosquera Córdoba (born January 15, 1987) is a Colombian footballer who currently plays for Cúcuta Deportivo.

Career
Mosquera began his youth career with Centauros Villavicencio and made his first team debut with the club in 2006. After two seasons with Centauros he signed with Primera A club  Deportes Quindío and remained at the club until 2010. Mosquera quickly established himself as a first team starter for Quindío. For the second half of the 2010 season he was loaned to La Equidad. Mosquera continued as a regular starter for his new club and also played for La Equidad in the 2011 Copa Sudamericana. On August 19, 2011 he helped lead his club to a 2-0 victory over Peru's Juan Aurich, scoring the game's opening goal in the Copa Sudamericana match.

In January 2012 it was reported that Mosquera was close to signing with top Colombian club Millonarios, however Mosquera decided against the offer and began negotiating to join a club in Major League Soccer (MLS). The Portland Timbers of MLS announced the signing of Mosquera on January 17, 2012.

Mosquera was released by Portland on May 15, 2013.

References

External links

1987 births
Living people
Sportspeople from Chocó Department
Association football defenders
Colombian footballers
Colombian expatriate footballers
Categoría Primera A players
Major League Soccer players
Peruvian Primera División players
Centauros Villavicencio footballers
Deportes Quindío footballers
La Equidad footballers
Portland Timbers players
Once Caldas footballers
Águilas Doradas Rionegro players
Ayacucho FC footballers
Cúcuta Deportivo footballers
Expatriate soccer players in the United States
Colombian expatriate sportspeople in the United States
Expatriate footballers in Peru
Colombian expatriate sportspeople in Peru